The surname Wissing may refer to:

Dylan Wissing, American drummer
Jens Wissing, German footballer
Norbert Wissing, Dutch composer
Willem Wissing (1656–1687), Dutch portrait artist who worked in England

See also
Vizing, a latinization of the phonetic transcription of the surname into Russian language

German toponymic surnames